Craig Mullen (born 15 January 1998) is a former professional rugby league footballer who last played as a  or er for Newcastle Thunder in the RFL Championship.

He played for the Wigan Warriors in the Super League, and has spent time on loan from Wigan at the London Skolars in Betfred League 1, and the Swinton Lions and Leigh in the Championship.

Background
Mullen was born in Wigan, Greater Manchester, England.

Career

Wigan Warriors
In 2018 he made his Super League début for Wigan against Wakefield Trinity.

Leigh Centurions
It was announced on 18 November 2020 that Craig would join Leigh on a permanent basis for the 2021 season.

Newcastle Thunder
On 25 Oct 2021 it was reported that he had signed for Newcastle Thunder in the RFL Championship

References

External links

Wigan Warriors profile
SL profile

1998 births
Living people
Leigh Leopards players
London Skolars players
Newcastle Thunder players
Rugby league wingers
Rugby league fullbacks
Rugby league players from Wigan
Swinton Lions players
Wigan Warriors players